, previously known under the stage name , is a Japanese actress, voice actress and singer. She is best known for her role as Riko Sakurauchi from Love Live! Sunshine!!. She is affiliated with Ken Production. In 2019, her song "Ordinary Love" was used as the ending theme to the anime series Senryu Girl. Her song "for..." is used as the opening theme to the anime series Val x Love.

Career

Until her voice acting debut 

Aida grew up as the only child of a single mother. In the second grade, she moved to Los Angeles, California with her mother in order to study abroad, where she lived for four years. 

Aida returned to Japan when she was in the fifth grade. Soon after, she began child acting and modeling. When Aida was in her first year of high school, she met a director and decided she wanted to begin professional acting. In her third year of high school, she was given the opportunity to act in a stage production directed by the same director she had previously met.

After graduating from high school, Aida worked part-time without pursuing higher education, and later enrolled in the  first-year basic course of the training school operated by Ken Production. She would go on to study for a year in the basic course and two years total in the training school, resulting in her being cast as Riko Sakurauchi in Love Live! Sunshine!!. In 2014, while enrolled in the training school, she made her voice acting debut in Pac-Man and the Ghostly Adventures as Ghost.

Aida was previously active under the name "Rikako Itō". At the time, she was a member of From First Production.

After debut as a voice actress
In 2015, Aida began performing with Aqours in the first season of Love Live! Sunshine!!. 

In February 2017, Aida performed in Aqours' first live performance at Yokohama Arena. In March of the same year, Aqours was awarded the Singing Award at the 11th Seiyu Awards. On August 25, 2017, Aida performed her first leading role in the movie Kuma no Gakkō: Patissier Jackie to Ohisama no Sweet as Jackie. "Animelo Summer Live 2017 -THE CARD-" (commonly known as "Anisama") was held on the first day of the release of "Kuma no Gakkō". On November 16, 2016, she appeared in the intro gravure of "Weekly Young Jump".

On July 18, 2018, it was announced that Aida would be the first playable character in the smartphone game "Maplas + Girlfriend" (as Yuka Komiya). On July 19, her first photo book "R.A." was released, with cumulative circulation reaching 28,000 copies.

The movie Love Live! Sunshine!! The School Idol Movie: Over the Rainbow was released in January 2019. In March of the same year, she announced her debut as a solo singer as the first artist of "DMM music" (a music label jointly operated by DMM.com and A-Sketch).

Filmography

Anime television series
Concrete Revolutio (2015) as Young Boy (ep 1)
Kabaneri of the Iron Fortress (2016) as Citizen (ep 4); Ichinoshin (ep 2); Sei (ep 3)
Love Live! Sunshine!! (2016) as Riko Sakurauchi
Macross Delta (2016) as Woman (ep 14)
My Hero Academia (2016) as Katsuki's friend (ep 7)
Sagrada Reset (2017) as Sawako Sera
Love Live! Sunshine!! 2nd Season (2017) as Riko Sakurauchi
Blend S (2017) as High School Girl (ep 8)
Pop Team Epic (2018) as Iyo Sakuraba (ep 5)
Senryu Girl (2019) as Koto Ōtsuki
Val × Love (2019) as Shino Saotome
LBX Girls (2021) as Riko
Those Snow White Notes (2021) as Yuna Tachiki
The Aquatope on White Sand (2021) as Fūka Miyazawa
Genjitsu no Yohane: Sunshine in the Mirror (2023) as Riko Sakurauchi

As Rikako Itō
Pac-Man and the Ghostly Adventures  (2014) as Ghost
Bakumatsu Rock (2014)

Theatrical animation
Kuma no Gakkou: Patissier Jackie to Ohisama no Sweet (2017) as Jackie
Love Live! Sunshine!! The School Idol Movie Over the Rainbow (2019) as Riko Sakurauchi

Video games
Hyperdevotion Noire: Goddess Black Heart (2014) as Poona (as Rikako Itō)
Love Live! School Idol Festival (2016) as Riko Sakurauchi
Girls' Frontline (2016) as HK CAWS and EM-2
Love Live! School Idol Festival All-Stars (2019) as Riko Sakurauchi
Magia Record as Maria Yuki
Atelier Ryza 2: Lost Legends & the Secret Fairy (2020) as Zephine Baudouin
Arknights (2020) as Quartz
Goonya Monster (2022) as Snail

Dubbing roles

Live-action
 Dungeons & Dragons: Honor Among Thieves as Keira (Chloe Coleman)
 Gossip Girl as Zoya Lott (Whitney Peak)
 House of the Dragon as Laena Velaryon (Nanna Blondell)
 Jappeloup (2021 BS TV Tokyo edition) as Raphaëlle Dalio (Lou de Laâge)
 Killing Eve as Villanelle (Jodie Comer)
 Pacific Rim: Uprising as Mei Lin (Lily Ji)
 Scream as Tara Carpenter (Jenna Ortega)

Animation
 The Angry Birds Movie 2 as Ella

Discography

Studio albums

Singles

References

External links
  
 Official agency profile 
 

Anime singers
Aqours members
Japanese child actresses
Japanese women pop singers
Japanese video game actresses
Japanese voice actresses
Ken Production voice actors
Voice actresses from Tokyo
21st-century Japanese actresses
21st-century Japanese women singers
21st-century Japanese singers
1992 births
Living people